Das Boot (The Boat) is a 1981 West German war film written and directed by Wolfgang Petersen, produced by Günter Rohrbach, and starring Jürgen Prochnow, Herbert Grönemeyer and Klaus Wennemann. It has been exhibited both as a theatrical release (1981) and a TV miniseries (1985). Also, several different home video versions, as well as a director's cut (1997) supervised by Petersen, have been released.

An adaptation of Lothar-Günther Buchheim's 1973 German novel based on his experiences aboard , the film is set during World War II and follows U-96 and her crew, as they set out on a hazardous patrol in the Battle of the Atlantic. It depicts both the excitement of battle and the tedium of the fruitless hunt, and shows the men serving aboard U-boats as ordinary individuals with a desire to do their best for their comrades and their country.

Development began in 1979. Several American directors were considered three years earlier, before the film was shelved. One of Petersen's goals was to guide the audience through "a journey to the edge of the mind" (the film's German tagline ), showing "what war is all about".

Produced on a DM32 million budget (about $18.5 million, equivalent to € million ), the high production cost ranks it among the most expensive films in German cinema, but it was a commercial success, grossing nearly $85 million worldwide (equivalent to $220 million in 2020). Columbia Pictures issued both German-language and English-dubbed versions in the United States theatrically through their Triumph Classics label, earning $11 million. Das Boot received positive reviews, and was nominated for six Academy Awards, two of these (Best Director and Best Adapted Screenplay) went to Petersen himself; he was also nominated for a BAFTA Award and DGA Award.

Plot 
He is driven by her captain and chief engineer to a raucous French bordello, where he meets some of the crew. Thomsen, another captain, gives a crude drunken speech to celebrate his Ritterkreuz award, in which he mocks Adolf Hitler.

The next morning, U-96 sails out of the harbour of La Rochelle, and Werner is given a tour of the boat. As time passes, he observes ideological differences between the new crew members and the hardened veterans, particularly the captain, who is embittered and cynical about the war. The new men, including Werner, are mocked by the rest of the crew, who share a tight bond. One Nazi officer, 1-WO (the first [watch] officer), is disliked by the others. After days of boredom, the crew is excited by another U-boat's spotting of an enemy convoy, but they are soon spotted by a British destroyer and bombarded with depth charges. They escape with only light damage.

The next three weeks are spent enduring a relentless North Atlantic gale. Morale drops after a series of misfortunes, but the crew is cheered temporarily by a chance encounter with Thomsen's boat. Shortly after the storm ends, the boat encounters a British convoy and quickly launches three torpedoes, sinking two ships. They are spotted by a destroyer and have to dive below test depth, the submarine's rated limit. During the ensuing depth-charge attack, the chief machinist, Johann, panics and has to be restrained. The boat sustains heavy damage, but is eventually able to safely surface when night falls. A British tanker they torpedoed is still afloat and on fire, so they torpedo it again, only to learn sailors are still aboard. The crew watches in horror as the sailors leap overboard and swim towards them. Unable to accommodate prisoners, the captain orders the boat away.

The worn-out U-boat crew looks forward to returning home to La Rochelle in time for Christmas, but the ship is ordered to La Spezia, Italy, which means passing through the Strait of Gibraltar—an area heavily defended by the Royal Navy. The U-boat makes a secret night rendezvous at the harbour of Vigo, in neutral although Axis-friendly Spain, with the SS Weser, an interned German merchant ship that clandestinely provides U-boats with fuel, torpedoes, and other supplies. The filthy officers seem out of place at the opulent dinner prepared for them, but are warmly greeted by enthusiastic officers eager to hear their exploits. The captain learns from an envoy of the German consulate that his request for Werner and the chief engineer to be sent back to Germany has been denied.

The crew finishes resupplying and departs for Italy. As they carefully approach the Strait of Gibraltar and are just about to dive, they are suddenly attacked and heavily damaged by a British fighter plane, wounding the navigator, Kriechbaum. The captain orders the boat directly south towards the North African coast at full speed, determined to save his crew even if he loses the boat. British warships begin shelling and they are forced to dive. When attempting to level off, the boat does not respond and continues to sink until, just before being crushed by the pressure, it lands on a sea shelf, at the depth of 280 metres. The crew works desperately to make numerous repairs before running out of oxygen. After over 16 hours, they are able to surface by blowing their ballast tanks, and limp back towards La Rochelle under cover of darkness.

The crew is exhausted when they finally reach La Rochelle on Christmas Eve. Shortly after Kriechbaum is taken ashore to a waiting ambulance, Allied planes bomb and strafe the facilities, wounding or killing many of the crew. Frenssen,  Lamprecht, and Hinrich are wounded. After the raid, Werner leaves the U-boat bunker in which he had taken shelter and finds the captain, badly injured by shrapnel, watching his U-boat sink in the dock. Just after the boat disappears under the water, the captain collapses and dies. Werner rushes to his body, and surveys the grim scene with tears in his eyes.

Cast 

"") and also called "" ("the Old Man") by his crew: A 30-year-old battle-hardened but good-hearted and sympathetic sea veteran, he complains to Werner that most of his crew members are boys. He is openly anti-Nazi, and embittered and cynical about the war, being openly critical about how the war is being handled.
Werner is mocked for his lack of experience, and soon learns the true horrors of service on a U-boat.
 Klaus Wennemann as chief engineer ( or LI,): A quiet and well-respected man. At age 27, the oldest crew member besides the Captain. Tormented by the uncertain fate of his wife, especially after hearing about an Allied air raid on Cologne. The second most important crewman, as he oversees diving operations and makes sure the systems are running correctly.
He has a condescending attitude and is the only crewman who makes the effort to maintain his proper uniform and trim appearance, while all the others grow their beards in the traditional U-Bootwaffe fashion. He was raised in some wealth in Mexico by his stepparents, who owned a plantation. His German fiancée died in a British air raid. He spends his days writing his thoughts on military training and leadership for the High Command. When the boat is trapped underwater near Gibraltar, he becomes pessimistic and begins to let go of his adherence to Nazi ideas as he finally stops shaving every day and wearing his proper uniform all the time.
 Martin Semmelrogge as second watch officer (II. WO,): A vulgar, comedic officer. He is short, red-haired and speaks with a mild Berlin dialect. One of his duties is to decode messages from base, using the Enigma code machine.
WO). Always slightly skeptical of the Captain and without enthusiasm during the voyage, he shows no anger when a convoy is too far away to be attacked. Kriechbaum has four sons, with another on the way.
Johann suffers a temporary mental breakdown during an attack by two destroyers. He is able to redeem himself by valiantly working to stop water leaks when the boat is trapped underwater near Gibraltar. Speaks a lower Austrian dialect.
He is one of the few crew members with whom Werner is able to connect; Werner offers to deliver Ullmann's stack of love letters when Werner is ordered to leave the submarine.
He gauges speed and direction of targets and enemy destroyers. Hinrich is one of the few crewmen that the Captain is able to relate to.
He gets upset after hearing on the radio that the football team most of the crew supports (FC Schalke 04) are losing a match, and they will "never make the final now".
 Claude-Oliver Rudolph as Ario: The burly mechanic who tells everyone that Dufte is marrying an ugly woman, and throws pictures around of Dufte's fiancée in order to laugh at them both.
Pilgrim and Frenssen love to trade dirty jokes and stories.
He is punched by Frenssen when the submarine is trapped at the bottom of the Strait of Gibraltar for praying rather than repairing the boat.
 Oliver Stritzel as Schwalle: A tall and well-built blond torpedoman.
 Jean-Claude Hoffmann as Benjamin: A red haired sailor who serves as a diving plane operator.
 Lutz Schnell as Dufte: The sailor who gets jeered at because of his upcoming marriage, and for a possible false airplane sighting.
 Konrad Becker as Böckstiegel: the Viennese sailor who is first visited by Hinrich for crab lice.
 Otto Sander as  Philipp Thomsen: An alcoholic and shell-shocked U-boat commander, who is a member of "The Old Gang". When he is introduced, he is extremely drunk and briefly mocks Hitler on the stage of the French bordello. (In the "Director's Cut" DVD audio commentary, Petersen says that Sander was really drunk while they were shooting the scene.) Sometime after U-96 departs, Thomsen is deployed once again and the two submarines meet randomly in the middle of the Atlantic Ocean being put off course by the storm. This upsets the Captain because it means that there is now a gap in the blockade chain. After failing to make contact later, it becomes apparent that Thomsen's boat is missing. When U-96 intercepts the convoy and sees they are without escorts, the Captain makes the observation that they must be away chasing down another boat; this boat is probably Thomsen's.
 Günter Lamprecht as the Captain of the Weser: An enthusiastic officer aboard the resupply ship Weser. He mistakes the 1st Watch Officer for the Captain as they enter the ship's elegant dining room. An ardent Nazi, he complains about the frustration of not being able to fight, but boasts about the food that has been prepared for the crew and the ship's "specialities".
 Sky du Mont as an officer aboard the Weser (uncredited).

Production 
In late 1941, war correspondent Lothar-Günther Buchheim joined  for her 7th patrol, during the Battle of the Atlantic. His orders were to photograph and describe the U-boat in action. In 1973, Buchheim published a novel based on his wartime experiences,  (The Boat), a fictionalised autobiographical account narrated by a "Leutnant Werner". It became the best-selling German fiction work on the war. The followup sequel  by Buchheim was released in 1995.

Production for this film originally began in 1976. Disagreements sprang up among various parties and the project was shelved. This effort primarily failed due to technical concerns, for example, how to film the close encounter of the two German submarines at sea during a storm.

Production of Das Boot took two years (1979–1981) and was the most expensive German film at the time. Most of the filming was done in one year; to make the appearance of the actors as realistic as possible, scenes were filmed in sequence over the course of the year. This ensured natural growth of beards and hair, increasing skin pallor, and signs of strain on the actors, who had, just like real U-boat men, spent many months in a cramped, unhealthy atmosphere.

Hans-Joachim Krug, former first officer on U-219, served as a consultant, as did Heinrich Lehmann-Willenbrock, the captain of the real U-96.

The film features both Standard German-speakers and dialect speakers. Petersen states in the DVD audio commentary that young men from throughout Germany and Austria were recruited for the film, as he wanted faces and dialects that would accurately reflect the diversity of the Third Reich around 1941. All of the main actors are bilingual in German and English, and when the film was dubbed into English, each actor recorded his own part (with the exception of Martin Semmelrogge, who only dubbed his own role in the Director's Cut). The German version is dubbed as well, as the film was shot "silent", because the dialogue spoken on-set would have been drowned out by the gyroscopes in the special camera developed for filming. Unusually, the film's German version actually grossed much higher than the English-dubbed version at the United States box office.

Sets and models 

Several different sets were used. Two full-size mock-ups of a Type VIIC boat were built, one representing the portion above water for use in outdoor scenes, and the other a cylindrical tube on a motion mount (hydraulic gimbal) for the interior scenes. The mock-ups were built according to U-boat plans from Chicago's Museum of Science and Industry.

The outdoor mock-up was basically a shell propelled with a small engine, and stationed in La Rochelle, France, and has a history of its own. One morning the production crew walked out to where they kept it afloat and found it missing. Someone had forgotten to inform the crew that an American filmmaker had rented the mock-up for his own film shooting in the area. This filmmaker was Steven Spielberg and the film he was shooting was Raiders of the Lost Ark. A few weeks later, during production, the mock-up cracked in a storm and sank, was recovered and patched to stand in for the final scenes. The full-sized mock-up was used during the Gibraltar surface scenes; the attacking aircraft (played by a North American T-6 Texan / Harvard) and rockets were real while the British ships were models.

A mock-up of a conning tower was placed in a water tank at the Bavaria Studios in Munich for outdoor scenes not requiring a full view of the boat's exterior. When filming on the outdoor mockup or the conning tower, jets of cold water were hosed over the actors to simulate the breaking ocean waves. A half-sized full hull operating model was used for underwater shots and some surface running shots, in particular the meeting in stormy seas with another U-boat. The tank was also used for the shots of British sailors jumping from their ship; a small portion of the tanker hull was constructed for these shots.

During the filming there was a scene where actor Jan Fedder (Pilgrim) fell off the bridge while the U-boat was surfaced. During the played rescue, Bernd Tauber (Chief Helmsmann Kriechbaum) really broke two ribs. This event is often purported as Jan Fedder breaking the ribs.

The interior U-boat mock-up was mounted five metres off the floor and was shaken, rocked, and tilted up to 45 degrees by means of a hydraulic apparatus, and was vigorously shaken to simulate depth charge attacks. Petersen was admittedly obsessive about the structural detail of the U-boat set, remarking that "every screw" in the set was an authentic facsimile of the kind used in a World War II U-boat. In this he was considerably assisted by the numerous photographs Lothar-Günther Buchheim had taken during his own voyage on the historical U-96, some of which had been published in his 1976 book,  ("U-Boat War").

Throughout the filming, the actors were forbidden to go out in sunlight, to create the pallor of men who seldom saw the sun during their missions. The actors went through intensive training to learn how to move quickly through the narrow confines of the vessel.

Special camera 
Most of the interior shots were filmed using a hand-held Arriflex of cinematographer Jost Vacano's design to convey the claustrophobic atmosphere of the boat. It had two gyroscopes to provide stability, a different and smaller scale solution than the Steadicam, so that it could be carried throughout the interior of the mock-up.

Historical accuracy 

Wolfgang Petersen created the film based on Buchheim's novel of the same name with several alterations to the plot and characters.

On 27 October 1941, U-96 left for her seventh patrol and joined group Stoßtrupp three days later. The next day, 31 October, the group made contact with convoy OS 10. U-96 launched four torpedoes at a long range, one of which struck the Dutch SS Bennekom. The ship went down half an hour after being hit, taking nine of her crew of 56 with her.
Following the attack, the sloop  arrived on the scene and forced U-96 under water with gun fire. The U-boat escaped the barrage of 27 depth charges unscathed.

The U-boat spent November patrolling the North Atlantic as part of groups Störtebecker and Benecke, until secretly entering the neutral port of Vigo, Spain, and being resupplied by the interned German  on 27 November. After leaving Vigo, U-96 made for the Straits of Gibraltar, with orders to enter the Mediterranean. However, late on 30 November the U-boat was spotted by a Fairey Swordfish of 812 Naval Air Squadron and heavily damaged by two bombs dropped by the aircraft. Unable to reach her destination, U-96 made for the port of Saint Nazaire. On the way she encountered the Spanish SS Cabo De Hornos, which returned from South America, after delivering a group of Jewish refugees to the Dutch colony of Curaçao, when Brazil denied them entry. When U-96s torpedo missed, the ship was stopped and her papers checked.

The rest of the officers are either indifferent or openly anti-Nazi (the Captain). The enlisted sailors and NCO are portrayed as apolitical. In his book Iron Coffins, former U-boat commander Herbert A. Werner states that the selection of naval personnel based on their loyalty to the party only occurred later in the war (from 1943 onward)  when the U-boats were suffering high casualties and when morale was declining. Such a degree of skepticism may or may not have occurred. In support of Das Boot on this subject, U-boat historian Michael Gannon maintains that the U-boat navy was one of the least pro-Nazi branches of the German armed forces.

Both the novel and the film had a much darker ending than in reality, where the U-boat returns to port only to be destroyed during an air raid with many of her crew killed or wounded. In reality, U-96 survived almost to the end of the war, the majority of her senior officers surviving as well. Similarly to its on-screen fate, it was sunk by Allied bombers at its berth in Wilhelmshaven in March 1945.

Even though the beginning and the end of the film occur in the port of La Rochelle, it does not correspond historically. The submarine base in La Rochelle was not functional before November 1941, and at the time of the film the port was dried up. While Saint-Nazaire was the base used in the novel and where U-96 was based at in late 1941, the film was changed to La Rochelle because its appearance had not changed to such a large degree in the years since World War II. Moreover, none of the British fighter-bombers of late 1941 to early 1942 had the range to bomb La Rochelle from bases in Great Britain.

Release
The film opened 17 September 1981 and received the widest release ever in West Germany, opening in 220 theatres and grossing a record $5,176,000 in the first two weeks.

The film opened in the United States on 10 February 1982.

Different versions and home media 
Petersen has overseen the creation of several different versions. The first to be released was the 149-minute theatrical cut.

As the film received partial financing by German television broadcasters WDR and the SDR, more footage was shot than was shown in the theatrical version. A version of six 50-minute episodes was transmitted on BBC2 in the United Kingdom in October 1984 and again during the 1999 Christmas season. In February 1985, a version of three 100-minute episodes was broadcast in Germany.

In 1997, Peterson edited a new theatrical release, a 209-minute version, entitled The Director's Cut, combining the action sequences from the feature-length release with the character development scenes from the miniseries, also improving audio quality. In 1998, this cut was released on DVD as a single-disc edition including an audio commentary by Petersen, Prochnow and director's cut producer Ortwin Freyermuth; a 6-minute making-of featurette; and in most territories, the theatrical trailer. In 2003, it was also released as a "Superbit" edition with no extra features, but with a higher bit-rate and the film spread across two discs.

From 2010 onwards, the "Director's Cut", along with various new extras, was released internationally on Blu-ray. The American 2-disc Collector's Set also uniquely included the original 149-minute theatrical cut, which is otherwise unreleased on DVD or Blu-ray.

In 2014, the original 308-minute miniseries, also known as The Original Uncut Version, was released on Blu-ray in Germany with optional English audio and subtitles.

In November 2018, a "Complete Edition" was released as a collection of five Blu-ray discs and three CDs. It contains more than 30 hours of material: the Director's Cut (208 min.), the Original Cinema version (149 min.), the complete TV Series in 6 parts ("The Original Uncut Version", 308 min.), Bonus Material (202 min. + various trailers), the Original Soundtrack by Klaus Doldinger (38:21 min.) and a German-language audiobook of the novel read by Dietmar Bär (910 min.).

For the "Director's Cut", the Original Cinema version and "The Original Uncut Version" TV Series, new English language soundtracks were recorded featuring most of the original cast, who were bilingual. These soundtracks are included on various DVD and Blu-ray releases as an alternative language to the original German.
 1981 unreleased version (209 minutes)
 1981 original theatrical cut (149 minutes)
 1984 BBC miniseries (300 minutes)
 1997 "Director's Cut" (208 minutes)
 2004 "The Original Uncut Version" (293 minutes) – miniseries minus episode-opening flashback scenes

Reception

Critical response 
The film received highly positive reviews upon its release. Roger Ebert of the Chicago Sun-Times gave the film four out of four stars.
Prior to the 55th Academy Awards on 11 April 1983 the movie received six nominations.
Cinematography for Jost Vacano, Directing for Wolfgang Petersen, Film Editing for Hannes Nikel, Sound for Milan Bor, Trevor Pyke, Mike Le-Mare, Sound Effects Editing for Mike Le-Mare, Writing (Screenplay based on material from another medium) for Wolfgang Petersen.

Today, the film is seen as one of the greatest German films. On review aggregator website Rotten Tomatoes, the film received an approval rating of 98% based on 55 reviews, with an average rating of 9.10/10. The critical consensus states "Taut, breathtakingly thrilling, and devastatingly intelligent, Das Boot is one of the greatest war films ever made." The film also has a score of 86 out of 100 on Metacritic based on 15 critics indicating "universal acclaim". For its unsurpassed authenticity in tension and realism, it is regarded internationally as pre-eminent among all submarine films. The film was ranked #25 in Empire magazine's "The 100 Best Films Of World Cinema" in 2010.

In late 2007, there was an exhibition about the film Das Boot, as well as about the real U-boat U-96, at the Haus der Geschichte (House of German History) in Bonn. Over 100,000 people visited the exhibition during its four-month run.

Buchheim's views of the film
Though impressed by the technological accuracy of the film's set-design and port construction buildings, novelist Lothar-Günther Buchheim expressed great disappointment with Petersen's adaptation in a film review published in 1981, describing Petersen's film as converting his clearly anti-war novel into a blend of a "cheap, shallow American action flick" and a "contemporary German propaganda newsreel from World War II".

Accolades 
Das Boot kept the record  for a German film with the most Academy Award nominations, until All Quiet on the Western Front, which has nine nominations including Best Picture.

Soundtrack 
The characteristic lead melody of the soundtrack, composed and produced by Klaus Doldinger, took on a life of its own after German rave group U96 created a remixed "techno version" in 1991. The title theme "Das Boot" later became an international hit.

The official soundtrack features only compositions by Doldinger, except for "" sung by Rina Ketty. The soundtrack ("") released following the release of The Director's Cut version omits "".

Songs heard in the film, but not included on the album are "La Paloma" sung by Rosita Serrano, the "" (a popular military march), "It's a Long Way to Tipperary" performed by the Red Army Chorus, "" and the "".

Sequel 
A sequel of the same name, in the form of a television series, was released in 2018, with different actors. It was set nine months after the end of the original film, and is split into two narratives, one based on land, the other set around another U-boat and its crew. Like the original film, the series is based on Lothar-Günther Buchheim's 1973 book Das Boot, but with additions from Buchheim's 1995 follow-up sequel .

See also 
 List of World War II films
 Submarine films
 Battle of the Atlantic (1939–1945)
 , 1941 propaganda film
 , 1958 anti-war film
 The Cruel Sea, 1953 film about a Royal Navy escort during the Battle of the Atlantic
 Sharks and Little Fish

References

External links 

 
 
 
 
 

1981 films
1980s war drama films
German war drama films
1980s German-language films
Anti-war films about World War II
German epic films
Films based on German novels
Films based on military novels
World War II submarine films
Films directed by Wolfgang Petersen
Films scored by Klaus Doldinger
Columbia Pictures films
Films set in the 1940s
1980s German television miniseries
World War II television drama series
U-boat fiction
International Emmy Award for Drama winners
1980s German films
Submarine films